Lia Tanzi (born 3 November 1948) is an Italian actress and television personality.

Life and career 
Born in Buenos Aires to Italian parents, Tanzi moved to Parma at young age. She studied acting at the Drama School of the Piccolo Teatro in Milan where she met her future husband, the actor Giuseppe Pambieri. She is mainly active on stage, often together with Pambieri and with their daughter, Micol. Tanzi is also active in TV-series and films, mainly of comedic genre.

Selected filmography 
 Claretta and Ben (1973)
 The Violent Professionals (1973)
 Poker in Bed (1974)
 Kidnap (1974)
 Too Young to Die (1975)
 Al piacere di rivederla (1976)
 The Virgo, the Taurus and the Capricorn (1977)
 La stanza del vescovo (1977)
 Speed Cross (1980)
 Mia moglie è una strega (1980)
 Quando la coppia scoppia (1981)
 Bollenti spiriti (1981) 
 Le ali della vita (2000)

References

External links 

People from Buenos Aires
Italian stage actresses
Italian film actresses
Italian television actresses
1948 births
20th-century Italian actresses
Living people